Aguaturbia is a Chilean rock band formed in 1969, featuring Denise Corales on vocals and her husband Carlos on guitar. The band is known for pioneering heavy psychedelic rock in Chile, eventually enjoying international acclaim. In addition to psychedelic sounds, wah-wah guitar effects and heavy blues rock chord patterns, Aguaturbia also incorporated elements of Latin American folk music into their work. The band is noted for causing controversy in the Chilean press at the time for stepping outside of prevailing social norms.

Original drummer Willy Cavada died on 1 October 2013.

Discography

Albums 
 1969 – Aguaturbia
 1970 – Aguaturbia Vol. 2
 1970 – Psychedelic Drugstore
Aguaturbia acoustic version (2010, Milodon)
Aguaturbia Vol. 2 (2010, Lion records USA)
 2017 – Fe, amor y libertad

Compilations 
 1996 – Psychedelic Drugstore
Aguaturbia Complete Tracks (2000, Runner Records)
 2010 – Aguaturbia acoustic version
 2010 – Aguaturbia vol 1 y 2 Vinil Lion Records

Band members 

 Denise Corales – vocals
 Carlos Corales – guitar
 Willy Cavada – drums (1968–2013)
 Ricardo Briones – bass (1968–1974)

References

External links 
Official website
Review of first album

Psychedelic rock music groups
Chilean rock music groups